Home Again is a 2012 Canadian drama film directed by Sudz Sutherland, shot primarily in Trinidad and Tobago and set in Kingston, Jamaica, about three people who have been deported back to Jamaica, despite having lived in Canada, United States and United Kingdom for most of their lives.

Production
Sutherland and Holness first approached the National Film Board of Canada (NFB) to make a documentary, but their proposal was declined. Instead, the NFB later supported them to do research in Jamaica for a fiction film, which included interviewing 40 deportees in Kingston and Ocho Rios.

Cast
 Lyriq Bent as Dunston Williams
 Stephan James as Everton St.Clair
 Fefe Dobson as Cherry C.
 Richard Chevolleau as Jammix
 Paul Campbell as Uncle Archie Morris
 Kadeem Wilson as Jim "The Don" Gilbert
 Brian Brown as Ras Leon
 Tatyana Ali as Marva Johnson

References

External links
 
 

2012 films
2012 drama films
Canadian drama films
English-language Canadian films
Films directed by Sudz Sutherland
National Film Board of Canada films
Films set in Jamaica
Films about immigration in Canada
2010s English-language films
2010s Canadian films